Leon Ginsburg is a Holocaust survivor and the subject of several books on World War II. Known as a child by his Hebrew name, Noikele Ginsburg was the only child survivor from Maciejów, Ukraine, a shtetl of 5,000 in Eastern Poland (now part of Ukraine). He survived on his wits, instinctively making the right split second decisions that saved his life, over and over again.   
Ginsburg was interviewed by Peter Jennings for his seminal book, The Century (Doubleday 1989)  and by Jane Marks for her book, Hidden Children of the Holocaust (Ballantine 1993). More recently, his riveting story was written in its entirety by his daughter, Suzanne Ginsburg, under the title, Noike: a Memoir of Leon Ginsburg, (Avenger Books 2012).

References

External links 
 Noike: A Memoir of Leon Ginsburg
 The Century by Peter Jennings (Amazon)
 Hidden Children by Jane Marks (Amazon)
 "My survival is not typical," Palm Beach Post (September 2011)

Living people
20th-century Polish Jews
Holocaust survivors
Year of birth missing (living people)